The chief justice of Liberia is the head of the judicial branch of the Government of the Republic of Liberia and the chief judge of the Supreme Court of Liberia.

Appointment and term
Article 54(c) of the Constitution stipulates that the chief justice is appointed by the president of Liberia and confirmed by the Senate. Per Article 68, eligibility for the position of chief justice requires that the candidate:
be a citizen of Liberia;
be of good moral character;
have been a counselor of the Supreme Court Bar for at least five years.

Article 71 states that the chief justice  "shall hold their offices during good behavior." According to Article 72(b), the chief justice must retire from office upon reaching the age of 70, though he may remain on the Court long enough to render judgment or perform any judicial duties regarding matters he began addressing before reaching that age.

Duties
In addition to acting as head judge on the Supreme Court and managing all subordinate courts, the Constitution provides several duties to the chief justice. In the case of impeachment of the president or vice president, Article 43 mandates that the chief justice preside over the trial in the Senate. Additionally, Article 53(a) requires the chief justice to swear in the president in front of a joint session of the Legislature.

Removal from office
The chief justice may be removed from office upon impeachment by the House of Representatives and conviction by the Senate. Article 71 of the Constitution stipulates that the chief justice may only be removed in the event of "misconduct, gross breach of duty, inability to perform the functions of their office, or conviction in a court of law for treason, bribery or other infamous crimes." In the event of an impeachment trial of the chief justice in the Senate, the president of the Senate presides over the proceedings.

Only one chief justice, Chea Cheapoo, has been removed in this manner.

List of chief justices

Source: 

 Status

Notes

References

Dossen, J. J., Supreme Court reports: Cases argued and determined in the Supreme Judicial Court of the Republic of Liberia, January, 1861-January, 1907, Volume 1.

External links
Text of the 1986 Constitution

Presidents
 
1847 establishments in Liberia